The men's 100 metre backstroke event at the 1960 Olympic Games took place between August 30 and 31. This swimming event used backstroke.  Because an Olympic-size swimming pool is 50 metres long, this race consisted of two lengths of the pool.

Medalists

Results

Heats

Five heats were held; the fastest sixteen swimmers advanced to the Semifinals.  The swimmers that advanced to the Semifinals are highlighted.

Heat One

Heat Two

Heat Three

Heat Four

Heat Five

Semifinals

Two heats were held; the fastest eight swimmers advanced to the Finals.  Those that advanced are highlighted.

Semifinal One

Semifinal Two

Final

Key: OR = Olympic record

References

Men's backstroke 100 metre
Men's events at the 1960 Summer Olympics